The 1940 Cincinnati Reds season was the 58th season for the franchise. Cincinnati entered the season as the reigning National League champions, having been swept by the New York Yankees in the World Series the previous year. They would defeat the Detroit Tigers four games to three to take the World Series title.

Offseason 
 October 14, 1939: Hank Sauer was drafted by the Reds from the New York Yankees in the 1939 minor league draft.
 October 19, 1939: Al Simmons was released by the Reds.

Regular season 

Cincinnati won 100 games for the first time in franchise history. The team finished first in the National League with a record of 100–53, winning the pennant by 12 games over the Brooklyn Dodgers, and the best record in MLB. They went on to face the Detroit Tigers in the 1940 World Series, beating them in seven games. This was their first championship since 1919.

In August, back up catcher Willard Hershberger, depressed over what he felt was culpability for losing both games of a doubleheader, took his life. Coach Jimmie Wilson was added to the roster as the back up catcher. The Reds players would vote to send Hershberger's share of the World Series winnings to his mother

Season standings

Detailed record

Record vs. opponents

Notable transactions 
 August 23, 1940: Jimmy Ripple was selected off waivers by the Reds from the Brooklyn Dodgers.

Roster

Player stats

Batting

Starters by position 
Note: Pos = Position; G = Games played; AB = At bats; H = Hits; Avg. = Batting average; HR = Home runs; RBI = Runs batted in

Other batters 
Note: G = Games played; AB = At bats; H = Hits; Avg. = Batting average; HR = Home runs; RBI = Runs batted in

Pitching

Starting pitchers 
Note: G = Games pitched; IP = Innings pitched; W = Wins; L = Losses; ERA = Earned run average; SO = Strikeouts

Other pitchers 
Note: G = Games pitched; IP = Innings pitched; W = Wins; L = Losses; ERA = Earned run average; SO = Strikeouts

Relief pitchers 
Note: G = Games pitched; W = Wins; L = Losses; SV = Saves; ERA = Earned run average; SO = Strikeouts

1940 World Series

Game 1 
October 2, 1940, at Crosley Field in Cincinnati

Game 2 
October 3, 1940, at Crosley Field in Cincinnati

Game 3 
October 4, 1940, at Briggs Stadium in Detroit

Game 4 
October 5, 1940, at Briggs Stadium in Detroit

Game 5 
October 6, 1940, at Briggs Stadium in Detroit

Game 6 
October 7, 1940, at Crosley Field in Cincinnati

Game 7 
October 8, 1940, at Crosley Field in Cincinnati

Farm system 

LEAGUE CHAMPIONS: Durham

References

External links
1940 Cincinnati Reds season at Baseball Reference

Cincinnati Reds seasons
Cincinnati Reds season
National League champion seasons
World Series champion seasons
Cincinnati Reds